Chendia-Todur (also spelt Chendiya) is a twin village in the Karwar Taluk of Uttar Kannada District of Karnataka. It lies 13 km south of the city of Karwar, 257 km north of the chief port city Mangalore and 489 km from the state capital Bangalore.

Geography 
The nearby villages are Amdalli (4 km), Shirwad (6 km), Kadwad (7 km). The surrounding taluks are Ankola Taluk to the east, Canacona Taluk to the north and Kumta Taluk to the south. Karwar, Curchorem Cacora, Madgaon, Margao are the nearest cities.

The total geographical area of village is 1430.22 hectares with a total population of 3,140 people.

Climate 
Since it is near to Arabian Sea, the weather is warm and humid.

Languages 
Kannada and Konkani are the local languages.

Agriculture 
Cash crops and food crops are grown. Crops include varieties of mangoes: asaid, payri, neelam, mushral, totapuri and got. Chendia-Todur is part of India's strategic Naval Base Sea Bird Project. 

The Pin code is 581324 and postal head office is Chendia.

The location code or village code of Todur village is 602626. Todur village is located in Karwar Tehsil of Uttara Kannada district in Karnataka, India. It is situated 13km away from Karwar, which is both district and sub-district headquarter of Todur village. Thoduru is the gram panchayat of Todur village.

Tourism 
Nagarmadi fall is a ten foot high waterfall that passes underneath a huge rock into a big cave. Tourists swim in the pool at the bottom of the falls.

Connectivity 
There are roads to the nearby towns of Karwar, Madgaon, Yellapur, Dandeli. Chendia village can be reached by bus. There are regular local public and private buses to Karwar and Ankola. The nearest railway station is Karwar. Goa's Dabolim Airport is 87 km from Chendia-Todur.

Education 
Alumni of the New English school in Chendia include Vasant Banare and the Kamat brothers.

References 

Villages in Uttara Kannada district